Paweł Wąsek (born 2 June 1999 in Cieszyn) is a Polish ski jumper representing the sports club WSS Wisła. Wąsek was an Olympic athlete competing in the 2022 Winter Olympics.
His sister, Katarzyna Wąsek, is an Alpine skier.

Career
Wąsek debuted in FIS Cup in September of 2014 in Szczyrk at the age of 15 and took 67th place. He participated in the 2015 European Youth Olympic Winter Festival. He finished it with an individual 42nd place and 6th place in the team competition.
On 3 September 2016, Paweł Wąsek took 2nd place in FIS Cup in the swiss Einsiedeln. This wasn't just his first podium but also his first points in FIS Cup. One week later, he debuted in the Summer Continental Cup in Lillehammer taking 20th place. During that summer season, Wąsek stood on the podium three times in FIS Cup; 3rd place in Hinterzarten and 2nd and 1st place in Râșnov.
He took 7th individual place in Junior World Cup in 2017, 5th in the male team, and 7th in the mixed team competition. In February and March of the same year, Wąsek managed to regularly gain points in the FIS Ski Jumping Continental Cup and was the overall winner of the 2016-17 FIS Cup
Wąsek debuted in the World Cup series on January 28, 2018 in Zakopane. He took 44th individual place. His best individual result was 6th place in Nizhny Tagil on December 6, 2020.  Wąsek was an Olympic Athlete at the 2022 Winter Olympics in Beijing where he finished 21st in the individual large hill competition and 6th in the team large hill competition.

World Cup

Season standings

Individual starts

References

External links

1999 births
Living people
Polish male ski jumpers
Sportspeople from Silesian Voivodeship
People from Cieszyn
Ski jumpers at the 2022 Winter Olympics
Olympic ski jumpers of Poland
21st-century Polish people